The Medicine Lodge River is a  tributary of the Salt Fork of the Arkansas River in southern Kansas and northern Oklahoma in the United States.  Via the Salt Fork and Arkansas rivers, it is part of the watershed of the Mississippi River.

Name
The Medicine Lodge River got its name from a large hut built by the Kiowa Indians, who believed the water from the river had healing properties if ingested or inhaled in a sauna type room.

The United States Board on Geographic Names settled on "Medicine Lodge River" as the stream's name in 1968.  According to the Geographic Names Information System, it has also been known historically as "A-ya-dalda-pa River," "Medicine Lodge Creek" and "Medicine River."

Geography
The river rises in Kiowa County, Kansas and flows generally southeastwardly through Barber County in Kansas and Alfalfa County in Oklahoma, past the Kansas towns of Belvidere, Sun City and Medicine Lodge.

See also
List of Kansas rivers
List of Oklahoma rivers
Medicine Lodge, Kansas

References

Columbia Gazetteer of North America entry
DeLorme (2003).  Kansas Atlas & Gazetteer.  Yarmouth, Maine: DeLorme.  .
DeLorme (2003).  Oklahoma Atlas & Gazetteer.  Yarmouth, Maine: DeLorme.  .

Rivers of Kansas
Rivers of Oklahoma
Rivers of Alfalfa County, Oklahoma
Rivers of Barber County, Kansas
Rivers of Kiowa County, Kansas
Tributaries of the Arkansas River